Sig Grava (1934–2009) was an American scholar, professor emeritus, member of the faculty of Graduate School of Architecture, Planning and Preservation (GSAPP), Columbia University, since 1960, as a Professor of Urban Planning.

Grava did his master's degree and Ph.D. at the GSAPP, and was a member of the Planning faculty of this school since 1960. He served as Chairman of the Columbia University Architecture School's Division of Urban Planning from 1970 to 1974, and as Director of the Urban Planning Program in 1990–1993.

1934 births
2009 deaths
Columbia University faculty
American urban planners